Rijnwoude was a municipality in the western Netherlands, in the province of South Holland.

Rijnwoude was formed in 1991 as Rijneveld through the merger of the former municipalities of Benthuizen, Hazerswoude and Koudekerk aan den Rijn. In 1993 the municipality was renamed to Rijnwoude. In 2014 the municipality was dissolved and its land area was amalgamated into Alphen aan den Rijn.

The municipality of Rijnwoude consisted of the communities Benthorn, Benthuizen, Hazerswoude-Dorp, Groenendijk, Hazerswoude-Rijndijk (location of town hall), Hogeveen, and Koudekerk aan den Rijn.

References

Municipalities of the Netherlands established in 1993
Municipalities of the Netherlands disestablished in 2014
Former municipalities of South Holland
Alphen aan den Rijn